Dichocrocis erixantha is a moth in the family Crambidae. It is found on Vanuatu and in Australia.

The wingspan is about 18 mm. The forewings are deep orange-yellow with blackish markings. The hindwings are deep orange-yellow with waved blackish lines.

References

Moths described in 1886
Spilomelinae